El Familiar is a 1975 Argentine film.

Cast 

 Martín Adjemián
 Emilio Alfaro
 Hugo Álvarez
 Octavio Getino
 Ricardo Gil Soria
 Carlos Lagos
 Morena Lynch
 Noemí Manzano
 Carlos Muñoz
 Víctor Proncet

External links 

 

1975 films
Argentine drama films
1970s Spanish-language films
1970s Argentine films